Parliamentary elections were held in the People's Republic of Albania on 1 June 1958.
The Democratic Front was the only party able to contest the elections, and subsequently won all 188 seats. Voter turnout was reported to be almost 100%.

Results

References

Parliamentary elections in Albania
Albania
Parliamentary election
One-party elections
Albania parliamentary election